Akanksha, Aakanksha, Aakaankshaa, Akansha or Aakansha is a female given name of Sanskrit origin, meaning "desire" or "ambition". It has a spiritual context relating to aspiration and ambition. It is more related to need and not want.

Notable people with the name include:
 Akanksha Juneja (born 1990), Indian actress
 Akanksha Puri (born 1988), Indian model and actress
 Akanksha Sahai (born 1988), Indian athlete
 Akansha Sareen, Indian model and actress
 Akanksha Singh (born 1989), Indian basketball player
 Aakanksha Singh (born 1990), Indian actress